La Villa may refer to:

LaVilla, a neighborhood of Jacksonville, Florida and former independent city
La Villa, Texas, a city in Hidalgo County, Texas
La Villa, Pichilemu, a village in Pichilemu, Chile
La Villa de los Santos, Panama
La villa, 2017 French film released in English-speaking markets as The House by the Sea
Villa de Guadalupe, Mexico City, colloquially known as "La Villa"
La Villa-Basílica metro station, in Mexico City
La Villa (Mexico City Metrobús), a BRT station in Mexico City